The Dallas Marathon (formerly known as the Dallas White Rock Marathon and also known as the BMW Dallas Marathon for sponsorship reasons) is an annual marathon road running event usually hosted in December by Dallas, Texas, and is  having been held every year since 1971 (with the exception of 2013 and 2020).  The marathon begins and ends in Downtown Dallas and runs around White Rock Lake.  The race weekend also includes a 5K, a 10K, a half marathon, a 2-person half marathon relay, a 5-person full marathon relay, and a 50K ultramarathon.

Dallas Marathon results can be used to qualify for the Boston Marathon.

Since naming a primary beneficiary in 1997, the Dallas Marathon has donated more than $3.8 million to Texas Scottish Rite Hospital for Children.

History 

Looping around White Rock Lake twice, the marathon had 82 participants and 61 finishers.

In 1976, the race was moved from spring to the first Saturday in December because the new date historically offered good marathon-running weather.  As a result, the White Rock Lake Marathon was held twice that calendar year: once in February and once in December.

The Dallas Marathon had been the first leg of the Marathons of Texas, a series of winter marathons held approximately one month apart from each other from December through February in Texas, along with the Houston Marathon and the Austin Marathon.

In 2013, the race was cancelled the Friday before due to ice, with no refunds offered.

In 2016, BMW signed on to become the title partner changing the official event name to the BMW Dallas Marathon.

The 2020 race was cancelled & deferred to the weekend of  due to the coronavirus pandemic. Entrants that year were given either refunds or deferred automatic entry to next year's.

Course

Initial course 

The first course ran around White Rock Lake twice, for  each loop, and then went out  and back.  This course was used from 1971 to 1973, when part of the road situated west of the lake was torn up four days after the marathon for capital  improvement purposes.

Three-loop course 

The course was changed for the 1974 marathon to use a flat three-loop course situated on the eastern side of the lake.  This course was used for a few years.

Current course 

The current marathon course begins and ends at Dallas City Hall, and loops around White Rock Lake once.

The half marathon course does not include the loop around the lake, while the 50K ultramarathon also includes an out-and-back leg on Santa Fe Trail.

Winners 

Key: Course record (in bold)

Name history
2017: BMW Dallas Marathon 
2016: BMW Dallas Marathon 
2015: Dallas Marathon
2014: MetroPCS Dallas Marathon
2013: Cancelled due to inclement weather conditions
2012: MetroPCS Dallas Marathon
2010: MetroPCS Dallas White Rock Marathon
2009: MetroPCS Dallas White Rock Marathon, presented by NexBank
2008: Dallas White Rock Marathon presented by NexBank
2007: Wellstone's Dallas White Rock Marathon
2006: Wellstone's Dallas White Rock Marathon
2005: White Rock Marathon

Deaths 
In 1986, Edwin Brown died. He was 47.

On December 14, 2008 Erin Lahr collapsed and died during the race. She was 29.

See also
 White Rock Lake
 List of marathon fatalities

Notes

References

External links 
 Links to results from official site
 1998 race results
 1997 race results
 1996 race results
 Men's winners, 1971-2007, TXCN
 Dallas Marathon Official site
Dallas Marathon Past Race Winners
 Marathon Info

Recurring sporting events established in 1971
Marathons in the United States
Sports in Dallas